Flashpoint is a Canadian drama television series that originally aired on CTV in Canada and CBS in the United States before changing networks part way through the fourth season to ION Television. Flashpoint follows the lives of several officers working for an elite police tactical unit known as the Strategic Response Unit, which is called in by regular police to resolve situations beyond their control.

The series' debuted on July 11, 2008, and its final episode aired December 13, 2012. Episodes are listed by their official seasons per CTV episode lists and Canadian DVD releases, and include the original air dates in North America. In a few instances, Flashpoint episodes have been broadcast out of their production order by CTV, CBS, and ION.

Broadcast history
By the end of December 2008, only nine of the 13 episodes produced during the series' first season had been aired in North America, although all 13 episodes had been aired by New Zealand's TVNZ (TV2) as of December 10, 2008. In North America, the four remaining episodes of Season 1 were aired in January and February 2009; in North America, CBS and CTV initially billed these episodes as part of Season 2, rather than as part of their intended season, Season 1, as was done in international markets.

Eighteen new 2009 episodes were ordered by CTV and CBS—the original 13 ordered by CTV on August 25, 2008, plus five additional episodes that were ordered on November 19, 2008. The first nine of these new episodes, combined with the four holdover episodes from 2008 were aired as Season 2 in North America. The remaining nine episodes, although originally filmed for Season 2, were aired as "Season 3" beginning September 25, 2009, in Canada on CTV; however, CTV later corrected their online episode guide to report the seasons as produced rather than initially aired. The correction also holds for the DVD releases of "Season 2, Volume 1" and "Season 2, Volume 2". The last nine episodes of Season 2 began airing on June 4, 2010, in the United States on CBS and were shown in a different order from their original broadcast on CTV. CBS, however, erroneously refers to these episodes as "Season 3". A 13-episode third season was produced in Toronto from January to May 2010 and began airing in July 2010 on both CTV and CBS.

The fourth season of Flashpoint premiered July 8, 2011, on CTV. The fifth season of Flashpoint, which would bring it to 75 episodes, was announced by Bell Media on June 1, 2011.

Season 5 began filming in 2012. It was announced in May 2012 that the series would be ending at the end of its fifth season.

Series overview

Episodes

Season 1 (2008–09)

Season 2 (2009)

Season 3 (2010–11)

Season 4 (2011) 
The fourth season of Flashpoint premiered on July 8, 2011. In the U.S., the show moved from CBS to Ion Television after "Shockwave."

Season 5 (2012) 
Flashpoint'''s fifth and final season premiered on September 23, 2012, on CTV. The series finale aired on December 13, 2012.

 U.S. Nielsen ratings 
The following is a table for the United States ratings, based on average total estimated viewers per episode, of Flashpoint'' on CBS.

Season 1

Season 2

Season 3

Season 4

Related Links 
 Flashpoint (TV series)

References

External links 
  at CTV
  at CBS
 

Lists of Canadian drama television series episodes
Episodes